Simon Pepper  (1947 – 18 September 2018) was Director of the World Wildlife Fund (Scotland) from 1985 to 2005. He was also Lord Rector of the University of St Andrews between 2005 and 2008, having been inaugurated on 10 March, and was succeeded by Kevin Dunion.

Pepper was a board member of the Deer and Forestry Commissions in Scotland, as well as acting as an advisor to Scottish Ministers on Sustainable Development as a member of the Cabinet Sub-Committee on Sustainable Scotland.

He was awarded the OBE in the Millennium Honours List for his services to Sustainable Development, having served as a member of the Secretary of State's Advisory Group on Sustainable Development from 1994 to 1998.

Before joining WWF, Simon Pepper ran his own business in Scotland, providing holiday courses about cultural and natural heritage.  In 1971 he worked for one year as United Nations Volunteer for the Food and Agriculture Organization in Chad.

In 2011, Simon Pepper was appointed a member of the Heritage Lottery Fund's Committee for Scotland.

Simon Pepper died suddenly on 18 September 2018.

References

External links
List of Rectors

Rectors of the University of St Andrews
Scottish environmentalists
Officers of the Order of the British Empire
Fellows of the Royal Scottish Geographical Society
1947 births
2018 deaths